John William Henry Sharpe (born Portsmouth, 9 October 1957) is an English former professional footballer. His clubs included Southampton, Swansea City, and Gillingham, where he made nearly 200 Football League appearances.

During his season at Swansea City an injury occurred which meant the end of his professional career in football, after which he then featured in various charity football events.

References

1957 births
Living people
English footballers
Gillingham F.C. players
Southampton F.C. players
Swansea City A.F.C. players
Footballers from Portsmouth
Association football defenders